The Peugeot Speedfight is a scooter made by Peugeot Motocycles. It is available in air- or more expensive liquid-cooled versions.

The Speedfight is rebadged in Malaysia as Naza Flash, with some different body panels and larger displacement.

The Speedfight 2 was introduced in 2001 after the success of the original model. The designs of the front panel, rear panel and light are different on the two models. The Speedfight 2 is available in air-cooled and liquid-cooled variants. The model was also equipped with anti-dive front suspension

The Peugeot Speedfight 2 2000-2004 has a Gurtner carburetor instead of a Dell'Orto carburetor.

Peugeot released the Speedfight 3 in 2009, followed by the Speedfight 4 in 2014, with mainly cosmetic changes, which was also available in both air- and liquid-cooled variants.

Engine 
The Speedfight 1 and 2 were equipped with either an air-cooled or liquid-cooled 50cc 2-stroke engine with a vertical cylinder or a 100cc air-cooled 2 stroke engine with a vertical cylinder. Both 50cc air- and liquid-cooled engines shared the same bottom end, where as the 100cc engine has a tougher connecting rod, crankshaft, among other things.

The Speedfight 3 and 4 featured a horizontal cylinder 50cc 2 stroke engine, equipped with an electronic oil injection pump made by Dell'Orto, among various other design improvements. This engine was also shared in various other Peugeot scooters, like the Peugeot Ludix, Jet Force, New Vivacity, Streetzone, etc. The Speedfight 3 and 4 also came with a 50cc 4 stroke engine, a derivative of the popular GY6 4 stroke scooter engine. In the Speedfight 3 and 4, it seems to match the 4 stroke 50cc engines made by SYM, due to various engine parts being compatible with the ones found on SYM's engines.

Gallery

References

External links
 Official worldwide website of Peugeot Scooters

Speedflight
Motor scooters
Mopeds
Motorcycles introduced in 2000